Mount Colfax is a  mountain in the Capital District of New York. It is located north of Cambridge in Washington County. The mountain is the site of an  former fire lookout tower, which is closed to the public.

History
In 1950, the Conservation Department built an  Aermotor LS40 steel fire lookout tower on the mountain. The tower began fire lookout operations in 1951, reporting 23 fires and 750 visitors. Due to the increased use of aerial detection, the tower ceased fire lookout operations at the end of the 1970 fire lookout season. The tower still remains but is closed to the public.

References

Mountains of Hamilton County, New York
Mountains of New York (state)